The chancellor of the University of Mississippi is the chief administrator of the University of Mississippi in Oxford, Mississippi. The position was previously referred to as "president" until chancellor Frederick Augustus Porter Barnard suggested the change in 1858.

Chancellor John Davis Williams, who served during the Ole Miss riot of 1962 and most of the civil rights movement, attempted to remain neutral, stating "My business is to educate the students sent to me."

List

References

Works cited

External links
List & Biographies of the Chancellors of the University

University of Mississippi, Chancellors
Chancellors
Mississippi